Micropyropsis is a genus of Spanish and Moroccan plants in the grass family. The only known species is Micropyropsis tuberosa, native to Spain and Morocco. The species is listed as endangered.

References

Pooideae
Flora of Spain
Monotypic Poaceae genera
Flora of Morocco
Endangered plants